The Boekenleeuw is a Flemish literary award for the best book in children's literature by a Flemish author.

History 

The Referendumprijs voor Vlaamse kinder- en jeugdboeken award was established in 1962. In 1986 this award was replaced by the Boekenleeuw and the Boekenwelp awards.

The award was not given in 2017 due to reorganisation at Boek.be and due to reassessment of what awards the organisation would continue to support. The award was given again in 2018 sponsored by association of authors, composers and publishers SABAM and GAU (Groep Algemene Uitgevers).

Several authors have received the award multiple times, including Bart Moeyaert (six times), Anne Provoost (three times) and Diane Broeckhoven (two times). Jean-Claude van Rijckeghem and Pat van Beirs have also won the Boekenleeuw as co-authors on two separate occasions.

Winners 

 1986
 Gregie De Maeyer, Pief Poef Paf, mijn broek zakt af
 Lisette Hoogsteyns, Kinderen van de Falls
 Riet Wille, Raadsels te koop
 Edith Schreiber-Wicke (translation), Anton
 1987
 Diane Broeckhoven, Een dood vogeltje
 Johan Ballegeer, Geen meiden aan boord
 Monica Hughes (translation), Jacht in het donker
 1988: Not awarded
 1989
 Jaak Dreesen, De vlieger van opa
 Ron Langenus, Waar de zon ondergaat
 Patricia MacLachlan (translation), Lieve, lange Sarah
 1990: Detty Verreydt, Later wil ik stuntman worden
 1991: Anne Provoost, Mijn tante is een grindewal
 1992: Bart Moeyaert, Kus me
 1993: Not awarded
 1994: Diane Broeckhoven, Bruin zonder zon
 1995: Anne Provoost, Vallen
 1996: Bart Moeyaert, Blote handen
 1997: Willy Van Doorselaer, De wraak van de marmerkweker
 1998: Anne Provoost, De roos en het zwijn
 1999: Sylvia Vanden Heede, Vos en Haas
 2000: Bart Moeyaert, Het is de liefde die we niet begrijpen
 2001: Ina Vandewijer, Witte pijn
 2002: Heide Boonen, Duivelshanden
 2003: Ed Franck, Abélard en Héloïse
 2004: Bart Moeyaert, De schepping
 2005: Kaat Vrancken, Cheffie is de baas
 2006: Jean-Claude van Rijckeghem and Pat van Beirs, Jonkvrouw
 2007: Marita de Sterck, Kwaad bloed
 2008: Noëlla Elpers, Dolores
 2009: Els Beerten, Allemaal willen we de hemel
 2010: Kathleen Vereecken, Ik denk dat het liefde was
 2011: Pat van Beirs and Jean-Claude van Rijckeghem, Galgenmeid
 2012: Bart Moeyaert, De Melkweg
 2013: Bart Moeyaert, Wie klopt daar?
 2014: Jef Aerts, Groter dan een droom
 2015: Michael De Cock, Veldslag om een hart
 2016: Koos Meinderts, De zee zien
 2017: Not awarded
 2018: Annet Schaap, Lampje
 2019: Kathleen Vereecken, Alles komt goed, altijd
 2020: Bette Westera, Uit elkaar

References

External links 
 Boek.be (in Dutch)

Belgian literary awards
Awards established in 1986
1986 establishments in Belgium